Ilince is a village in the municipality of Preševo, Serbia. According to the 2002 census, the village has a population of 136 people. Of these, 134 (98,52 %) were ethnic Albanians, and 2 (1,47 %) were Hungarians.

References

Populated places in Pčinja District
Albanian communities in Serbia